Juggling 9 or Dropping 10 is the fifth studio album by the American progressive rock band Enchant. It was released in October 2000.

Track listing
"Paint the Picture" (Ott) – 7:03
"Rough Draft" (Craddick, Ott) – 6:14
"What to Say" (Craddick, Leonard, Ott) – 4:19
"Bite My Tongue" (Craddick, Ott) – 5:41
"Colors Fade" (Craddick, Ott) – 5:25
"Juggling Knives" (Craddick, Leonard, Ott) – 5:03
"Black Eyes and Broken Glass" (Craddick, Ott) – 4:33
"Elyse" (Craddick, Leonard, Ott) – 5:47
"Shell of a Man" (Leonard, Ott) – 6:01
"Broken Wave" (Craddick, Ott) – 5:23
"Traces" (Craddick, Ott) – 7:19
"Know That" (Craddick, Leonard, Ott) – 1:27

Personnel
 Mike "Benignus" Geimer – keyboard solo on "Juggling Knives"
 Paul Craddick – organ, acoustic guitar, bass guitar, guitar, percussion, piano, strings, drums, harpsichord, keyboards, mellotron, bass pedals, distortion
 Doug A. Ott – acoustic guitar, electric guitar, keyboards, bass guitar, piano, moog, organ, mellotron, EBow
Ted Leonard – vocals
Ed Platt – bass guitar on "Paint The Picture"

Production
James Bickers – liner notes
John Bartolucci – photography
Stefan Beeking – photography
Ernesto – narrator, chant
Thomas Ewerhard – layout design
Tom King-Size – engineer, mixing, drum engineering
Ken Lee – mastering

References

2000 albums
Enchant (band) albums
Inside Out Music albums